Alexandar Georgiyevich Georgiev (born 10 February 1996) is a Bulgarian-born Russian professional ice hockey goaltender for the Colorado Avalanche of the National Hockey League (NHL). He is the first Bulgarian-born player to play in the NHL.

Playing career
Born in Bulgaria, Georgiev started playing hockey in Russia, where his family moved shortly after he was born; he is a dual citizen of both countries. He started playing for the Moscow-based Penguins, then moved to Khimik Voskresensk, and later to Finland. Georgiev made his Liiga debut playing with TPS during the 2014–15 season.

Despite two standout seasons with TPS showing developmental promise, Georgiev went undrafted through the 2017 NHL Entry Draft. With an ambition to play in North America, Georgiev was invited to participate in the New York Rangers' developmental camp. In impressing through his performances, on 18 July 2017, he agreed to a three-year, entry-level contract with the Rangers. On 22 February 2018, Georgiev made his NHL debut where he made 38 saves as the Rangers lost 3–1 to the Montreal Canadiens. On 3 March, Georgiev stopped 35 shots and earned his first NHL win as the Rangers beat the Edmonton Oilers 3–2.

On 21 November 2018, Georgiev recorded his first career NHL shutout, winning 5–0 against the New York Islanders. On 10 February 2019, Georgiev made a career-high 55 saves in a 4–1 win over the Toronto Maple Leafs, becoming the goaltender with second-most saves in a game in Rangers' history, while also setting a record for most saves in regulation. In a 3 March game against the Washington Capitals, Georgiev threw his stick at the puck after forward Alexander Ovechkin had faked him out. Officials originally called it a no goal, but changed the call after reviewing it, granting a 3–2 shootout win to the Capitals.

On 7 July 2022, the negotiating rights to Georgiev were traded to the Colorado Avalanche in exchange for third-round and fifth-round picks in the 2022 NHL Entry Draft and third-round pick in the 2023 NHL Entry Draft. As a pending restricted free agent he quickly agreed to terms on a three-year, $10.2 million contract with the Avalanche on 10 July 2022.

Career statistics

Regular season and playoffs

International

Awards and honours

References

External links
 

1996 births
Living people
Bulgarian ice hockey goaltenders
Colorado Avalanche players
Hartford Wolf Pack players
HC TPS players
New York Rangers players
Sportspeople from Ruse, Bulgaria
Russian ice hockey goaltenders
Bulgarian emigrants to Russia
SaPKo players
Undrafted National Hockey League players
Russian expatriate sportspeople in the United States
Bulgarian expatriate sportspeople in the United States
Bulgarian expatriate sportspeople in Finland
Expatriate ice hockey players in Finland
Expatriate ice hockey players in the United States
Russian expatriate ice hockey people
Russian expatriate sportspeople in Finland